Laia Manzanares Tomàs is a Spanish actress best known for her role as the cheerleader and love interest in Tame Impala's 2015 music video for The Less I Know the Better, which became a sleeper hit and cult classic in the late 2010s. She is also known for playing the role of Ukrainian student Oksana Casanoves in the Spanish television series Merlí.

Early life 
Laia Manzanares Tomàs was born in 1994, to a Valencian father and Catalan mother. She was educated at the Institut Públic XXV Olimpiada high school and the Col·legi de Teatre, for two years, in Barcelona.

Manzanares was inspired to act professionally after watching Uma Thurman as Beatrix "The Bride" Kiddo in Quentin Tarantino's Kill Bill: Volume 1 and being impressed by the character's strength of personality. Hoping to inspire others in the same way, Manzanares expressed her hope to work with high school or elementary school students to help instill self confidence in young people going through the "most vulnerable" periods in their lives. Between castings she worked as a waitress and had she not become an actress she would have studied psychology.

Career 
In The Less I Know the Better, the surrealist Tame Impala music video, she is a cheerleader and the lover of a high school basketball player who is seduced by the gorilla mascot "Trevor".

In television roles she has appeared in series such as Merlí, El día de mañana, Ray, and Matar al Padre. In theatre roles, she has portrayed Amanda Todd (a Canadian teen who committed suicide due to cyberbullying and revenge pornography) in a dramatization called Amanda T. for TNC's youth theatre.

Filmography

Television

Theatre

Awards

Fugaz Awards

References 

1994 births
Living people
People from Barcelona
21st-century Spanish actresses
Spanish television actresses
Spanish film actresses
Spanish people of Catalan descent

External links